Dinodnavirus is a genus of viruses that infect dinoflagellates. This genus belongs to the clade of nucleocytoplasmic large DNA viruses. The name is derived from 'dino' (dinoflagellate) and DNA (from its genome).

The only species in the genus is Heterocapsa circularisquama DNA virus 01.



Virology
The virus has an icosahedral capsid ~200 nanometers in diameter.

The genome is a single molecule of double stranded DNA of a ~356-kilobases.

It infects the dinoflagellate Heterocapsa circularisquama.

During replication virions emerge from a specific cytoplasm compartment – the 'viroplasm' – which is created by the virus.

Taxonomy
The sole species was originally thought to belong to the family Phycodnaviridae. DNA studies have shown that it belongs in the family Asfarviridae.

References

Nucleocytoplasmic large DNA viruses
Virus genera